The 1998 Sparkassen Cup doubles was the tennis doubles event of the ninth edition of the Sparkassen Cup; a WTA Tier II tournament held in Leipzig, Germany.

Martina Hingis and Jana Novotná were the defending champions but chose not to compete this year.

Fourth seeds, Elena Likhovtseva and Ai Sugiyama won the title, defeating Manon Bollegraf and Irina Spîrlea in the final,

Seeds

Draw

External links
 1998 Sparkassen Cup Doubles Draw

Sparkassen Cup (tennis)
1998 WTA Tour